The 1993 Chicago Bears season was their 74th regular season completed in the National Football League (NFL). It was the Bears' first season since 1981 without Mike Ditka as head coach, as he had been fired following the team's 5–11 finish the year before. Under new head coach Dave Wannstedt, the Bears improved their record to 7–9 but again failed to make the playoffs.

The 1993 season would be the last for a number of contributors of the Bears' Super Bowl XX team of eight years earlier in Chicago uniforms; as following the season, offensive tackle Keith Van Horne retired, while defensive tackle Steve McMichael and defensive end Richard Dent left for Green Bay and San Francisco, respectively (though Dent would return to Chicago for 1995). Additionally; Neal Anderson, a 4-time Pro-Bowler who succeeded Walter Payton as the team's starting running back, retired after the season.

Offseason

NFL draft

Staff

Roster

Regular season

Schedule

Game summaries

Week 1

Week 2

Week 4

Standings

References

External links

 1993 Chicago Bears at Pro-Football-Reference.com

Chicago Bears
Chicago Bears seasons
1993 in sports in Illinois
1990s in Chicago
1993 in Illinois